José Antonio Carrasco Ramírez (born 8 September 1980 in Madrid) is a former Spanish cyclist.

Palmarès
2005
1st stage 3a Vuelta a Extremadura
2006
1st Vuelta Ciclista a León
2007
1st stage 2 Volta a Coruña
2012
1st stage 1 GP Abimota

References

1980 births
Living people
Spanish male cyclists
Cyclists from Madrid